Artem Nedolya (born 20 October 1993) is a Ukrainian football midfielder.

Nedolya is a product of Kyiv's different Youth Sportive Schools. His first trainer was Viktor Hryschenko. In 2011, he signed a contract with FC Sevastopol.

References

External links 

 

Ukrainian footballers
FC Sevastopol players
FC Olimpik Donetsk players
PFC Sumy players
FC Poltava players
FC Polissya Zhytomyr players
FC Kremin Kremenchuk players
FC Lviv players
Footballers from Kyiv
Association football midfielders
Ukrainian Premier League players
1993 births
Living people